The 1996 Malta International Football Tournament  (known as the Rothmans Tournament for sponsorship reasons) was the eighth edition of the Malta International Tournament. The competition was played between 7 and 11 February, with games hosted at the National Stadium in Ta' Qali.

Matches

Winner

Statistics

Goalscorers

See also 
China Cup
Cyprus International Football Tournament

References 

1995–96 in Maltese football
1995–96 in Slovenian football
1996 in Russian football
1996 in Icelandic football
1996